Ouled Driss is a district in Souk Ahras Province, Algeria. It was named after its capital, Ouled Driss.

Municipalities
The district is further divided into 2 municipalities:
Ouled Driss
Aïn Zana 

Districts of Souk Ahras Province